Eric Winstone (born 1 January 1913 in London, died 2 May 1974 in Pagham, Sussex) was an English big band leader, conductor and composer.

Biography and career
Playing piano in his spare time from a job as Westminster Gas and Coke Company led him to form his first band in 1935. He learned the accordion, started an accordion school and formed an accordion quintet, a swing quintet, and a big band orchestra.

During World War II his orchestra entertained the forces, and performed at holiday camps after the war. In 1955 a CinemaScope short of The Eric Winstone Bandshow was made.

He was quoted in 1955 as saying that 

His limited company, Eric Winstone Orchestras Ltd., was involved in a widely reported court case involving Diana Dors in 1957. Dors had been engaged to appear with the orchestra at a charity matinee in July 1954 for the RAF Association in Clacton, where Winstone's orchestra was playing a season at  Butlins holiday camp. She failed to fulfil the singing commitment, which was to take place in a cinema, due to having a septic throat. She claimed that the illness had been notified to the company. The company argued that she was fulfilling her film commitments and therefore the illness was an excuse, and furthermore that being unable to sing was not the issue at stake as merely saying "hello" would have sufficed. Winstone remarked to the audience that she was not a woman of her word, did not respect her obligations and considered the people of Clacton to be unworthy of her talents, He thereafter told a newspaper journalist that she had let him down. Winstone's company sued for breach of contract and this caused Dors to counter-sue for slander, the outcome of which was that the company was awarded £5 compensation and Dors received 100 guineas. The judge in the case said that the company's financial loss had been non-existent, having heard that it was to receive £210 for the performance and a further £40 if all the seats were sold. Dors, who was to receive £80 for her fifteen-minute appearance, donated her court award to the charity. Her husband had said in court that the need for a court's ruling (by which he was referring to the company's claim) was "a waste of time".

Personal life
Winstone had a somewhat tempestuous personal life at times. In September 1959 he obtained a court order that banned his mother-in-law from staying at his home. In the same month a court ordered that an "iron curtain" be constructed in the property so as to split the rooms between himself, then aged 46, and his wife and two-year-old daughter. He was also ordered to stop playing his piano by 6pm each day in order not to disturb his family. At that time he was using it to compose arrangements for three bands and five radio shows. Four months later, his then 26-year-old wife, Myrtle, a former fashion model, was seeking a judicial separation. They had married in February 1957.

Discography
Rumbas & Sambas EP - Eric Winstone And Los Chicos	1967

Notes

External links
 

1913 births
1974 deaths
Musicians from London
English bandleaders
Easy listening musicians
English conductors (music)
British male conductors (music)
20th-century English musicians
20th-century British male musicians